Clement Edwin Warren (28 July 1899–1956) was an English footballer who played in the Football League for Coventry City.

References

1899 births
1956 deaths
English footballers
Association football forwards
English Football League players
Coventry City F.C. players
Yeovil Town F.C. players
Walsall F.C. players
Worcester City F.C. players
Sportspeople from Nuneaton